Horseshoe Canyon may refer to:

 Horseshoe Canyon (Alberta) a canyon in Alberta, Canada
 Horseshoe Canyon Formation, a stratigraphical unit in the Western Canadian Sedimentary Basin
 Horseshoe Canyon (Chiricahua Mountains), a canyon in Cochise County, Arizona, United States 
 Horseshoe Canyon (Emery and Wayne counties, Utah) in southern Utah, United States